Federal Circuit Court could refer to:
Federal Circuit Court of Australia
Any of the 13 United States courts of appeals, but especially the United States Court of Appeals for the Federal Circuit
United States circuit court, abolished in 1912